Toi + Moi is a 2008 album recorded by French singer Grégoire. It was his debut album released in September 2008 and achieved huge success in France and Belgium (Wallonia) where it reached the top five. In France, it hit number-one in its 42nd and 47th weeks. It provided four singles : "Toi + Moi", which was a huge hit in Belgium and the French digital chart (#1), "Rue des Étoiles", "Ta Main" and "Nuages".

The album received generally positive reviews from musical critics. My Major Company, the label which released the album, stated : "Gregory is an excellent songwriter. Discover his captivating world, between torture and naivety, composed of catchy melodies serving magical texts." In 2012 the contestants of Star Académie covered the song in Québec to much popularity.

Track listings

CD
 "Ta Main" – 3:34
 "Nuages" – 3:08
 "Toi + Moi" – 3:03
 "Rien à voir" – 2:41
 "Ce qu'il reste de toi" – 3:32
 "Donne moi une chance" – 3:29
 "Rue des Étoiles" – 3:55
 "Sauver le monde" – 3:33
 "L'ami intime" – 3:09
 "Prière" – 3:52
 "Merci" – 3:21
 "À la claire fontaine – 2:34
 Bonus tracks
 "Rue des Étoiles" (acoustic) – 3:50
 "Nuages" (acoustic) – 3:00

DVD
 Grégoire : portrait – 14:30
 Live TV5 acoustic – 26:00
 "Toi + Moi" (music video) – 3:02
 "Rue des Étoiles" (music video) – 3:55

Credits and personnel

 Recording
 Written and composed by Grégoire (tracks: 1–11,13,14)
 Arranged by Franck Authié and Grégoire
 Mastered by Greg Calbi
 Mixed by Steve Forward
 Produced by Franck Authié
 Vocals by Grégoire

 Musicians
 Bass, banjo, mandolin and programmations by Franck Authié
 Cello by Delphine Capuçon (tracks : 4,5,10)
 Drums and percussion by Matthieu Rabaté
 Glockenspiel by Grégoire (tracks: 1,7)
 Guitar by Franck Authié (tracks: 1–11,13,14)
 Piano by Cyril Taïeb
 Violin by Karen Brunon (tracks: 4,5,10)

Release history

Charts and sales

Peak positions

Year-end charts

Certifications

References

2008 debut albums
Grégoire (musician) albums
French-language albums
Warner Music France albums
My Major Company albums